Prnjavor is a village in the municipality of Bihać, Bosnia and Herzegovina. It is located close to the Croatian border.

Demographics 
According to the 2013 census, its population was 350.

References

Populated places in Bihać